Bhara is a village in the Bishnupur CD block in the Bishnupur subdivision of the Bankura district in the state of West Bengal, India.

Geography

Location

Area overview
The map alongside shows the Bishnupur subdivision of Bankura district. Physiographically, this area has fertile low lying alluvial plains. It is a predominantly rural area with 90.06% of the population living in rural areas and only 8.94% living in the urban areas. It was a part of the core area of Mallabhum.

Note: The map alongside presents some of the notable locations in the subdivision. All places marked in the map are linked in the larger full screen map.

Demographics
According to the 2011 Census of India, Bhara had a total population of 2,970, of which 1,493 (50%) were males and 1,477 (50%) were females. There were 309 persons in the age range of 0–6 years. The total number of literate persons in Bhara was 1,679 (63.10% of the population over 6 years).

Education
Swami Dhananjoy Das Kathiababa Mahavidyalaya was established in 2009. Affiliated with the Bankura University it offers honours courses in Bengali, Sanskrit, English, education, history, music, geography and a general course in arts. The institution is named after the 56th Acharya of the Nimbarka Sampradaya Sri Mahanta Sri Sri 108 Swami Dhananjay Das Kathiababa, who was born at Bhara.

Bhara Dhananjoy Das Kathiababa High School is a Bengali-medium coeducational institution established in 1903. It has facilities for teaching from class V to class XII. The school has 5 computers, a library with 2,500 books and a playground.

Culture

Healthcare
There is a primary health centre at Bhora, with 10 beds.

References

Villages in Bankura district